James Nicholas Bailey is an American guitarist, songwriter, and producer that is signed to Prescription Songs. Bailey began his musical career playing guitar in the bands Over It and Runner Runner and now writes for other artists. As a songwriter, Nick has most recently co-written the songs "Ok Not To Be Ok" by Demi Lovato and Marshmello, "all I know" by Machine Gun Kelly and Trippie Redd, "Tonight" by jxdn and Iann Dior, and many more.

Career

Over It 
Nick Bailey is a founding member of Over It and performed as a guitarist and background vocalist. The band was signed to Virgin Records and released Step Outside Yourself.

Runner Runner 
Members of Over It, Don't Look Down and Rufio joined to form Runner Runner, which was signed to Capitol Records and achieved radio success with their songs "So Obvious" (charted at #34 on the pop charts) and "I Can't Wait", which has become a popular wedding song.

Selected writing and production discography

References

External links
http://www.theblueprintmusic.com

American male singer-songwriters
American singer-songwriters
Year of birth missing (living people)
Living people